The Minister of Justice of Austria heads the Ministry of Justice.

Ministers

First Republic

Second Republic

See also 
 Ministry of Justice (Austria)

Notes

References 

Justice